Bemidji Area Schools are the schools in Independent School District 31, serving the city of Bemidji in the State of Minnesota and other communities and rural areas near Bemidji.  Students from the cities of Solway, Tenstrike, Becida, Turtle River, Wilton, Puposky and portions of Cass Lake attend this school district.

The school district is one of the largest in the state, in terms of land area.

Early Education Centers
Paul Bunyan Center

Elementary schools
Lincoln Elementary
J.W. Smith Elementary
Solway Elementary
Northern Elementary
Horace May Elementary
Gene Dillon Elementary, Grades 4-5

Middle school
Bemidji Middle School, Grades 6-8

High school
Bemidji High School
Lumberjack High School

School districts in Minnesota
Education in Beltrami County, Minnesota